James L. Taft Jr. (October 21, 1930 – September 5, 2011) was an American politician who served in the Rhode Island Senate from 1963 to 1971 and as the Mayor of Cranston from 1971 to 1979.

He died on September 5, 2011, in Wakefield, Rhode Island at age 80.

References

1930 births
2011 deaths
Republican Party Rhode Island state senators
Mayors of Cranston, Rhode Island